Robin Renee Sanders (born 1954) is the former U.S. Ambassador to the Republic of the Congo (Congo-Brazzaville) from 2003 to 2005, and to Nigeria from 2007 to 2010. She is a 2010 D.Sc. graduate of Robert Morris University. and served as Deputy Commandant at the Eisenhower Resource College at the National Defense University in Washington, D.C. She has received numerous awards on her work with and advocacy for Africa small businesses and Africa Diaspora issues, and six award from the Department of State. She also served twice as the Director for Africa at the National Security Council at the White House, and received the medal of honor from the President of Republic of Congo

Early life and education
Sanders was born in 1954 and received her Bachelor of Arts degree in Communications from Hampton University in Hampton, Virginia, and Master of Arts in International Relations and Africa Studies and a Master of Science in Communications Ohio University in Athens, Ohio. Her doctorate degree is in Information Systems and Communications from Robert Morris University.

References

External links

Living people
Ohio University alumni
Robert Morris University alumni
Hampton University alumni
Ambassadors of the United States to Nigeria
United States National Security Council staffers
National Defense University
African-American diplomats
Ambassadors of the United States to the Republic of the Congo
1954 births
United States Foreign Service personnel
American women ambassadors
21st-century African-American people
21st-century African-American women
20th-century African-American people
20th-century African-American women